Anto Kovačević (21 March 1952 – 14 November 2020) was a Croatian philosopher, publicist and politician.

A native of Bosnia and Herzegovina, Kovačević earned a Ph.D. degree from the University of Vienna. He entered Croatian politics in early 1990s as one of the most prominent members of the Croatian Christian Democratic Union (HKDU). He was outspoken critic of Franjo Tuđman and his handling of war in Bosnia and Herzegovina. As a member of opposition alliance that included the left-wing Social Democratic Party of Croatia (SDP), he entered the Croatian Parliament in 1995.

As the rule of Franjo Tuđman neared its end, Kovačević, as well as his party, began to distance itself from Croatian political centre and shift to hardline nationalist right, embodied in their new partners Croatian Party of Rights (HSP).

During the 2005 presidential election, Kovačević ran as HKDU candidate, finishing 8th with 0.86% of the vote. He died from COVID-19 in Zagreb on 15 November 2020, at age 68.

References

External links
Parliament biography 

1952 births
Croats of Bosnia and Herzegovina
2020 deaths
Representatives in the modern Croatian Parliament
Croatian Christian Democratic Union politicians
Candidates for President of Croatia
Deaths from the COVID-19 pandemic in Croatia
Croatian nationalists
Burials at Mirogoj Cemetery